Russian Germans in North America are descended from the many ethnic Germans from Russia who emigrated to North America.

Migration to Canada and the United States by Russian Germans ( or) peaked in the late 19th century. The upper Great Plains of the United States and southern Manitoba, Alberta, and Saskatchewan in Canada have large areas that are populated primarily by descendants of Germans from Russia.

Their mother tongues were High German or Low German dialects although ethnic German communities had existed in Russia for many generations. Russian Germans frequently lived in distinct communities and maintained German-language schools and German churches. They were primarily Volga Germans from the lower Volga River valley; Black Sea Germans from the Crimean Peninsula/Black Sea region; or Volhynian Germans from the governorate of Volhynia in what is Ukraine. The smaller villages were often settled by colonists of a common religious denomination who had come from the same area and so a town is made up of German-speaking Catholics, Lutherans, or Jews, for instance. The people often settled together from the same region of Germany and so spoke the same German dialect. Also included were Plautdietsch-speaking Mennonites of Dutch ancestry, who are now mostly referred to as Russian Mennonites despite their origins and Low German language, as well as Hutterites, both of whom sought religious freedom.

Originally recruited and welcomed to the Russian Empire in the 18th century, when they were promised to be allowed to practice own language and religions and to be exempted from compulsory military service, the Russian Germans found increasing hardship. With changes in politics, the Russian government took back some of the privileges that had been granted, economic conditions grew poor, and there were a series of famines. Those conditions led to German mass migrations from Russia.

After the Bolshevik Revolution and the rise of the Soviet Union, particularly under the leadership of Joseph Stalin, conditions for the remaining Germans in Russia declined considerably. The subsequent rise of Nazi Germany, with its concern about ethnic Germans in other lands and proselytizing to the German Volk, led to suspicions of any Germans in Russia. In 1932 and 1933, the Soviet authorities forced starvation among the Volga Germans according to Western observers. Soviet authorities seized food supplies under the pretext of famine in the rest of the Soviet Union, and they ordered the breakup of many German villages.

After the German invasion of the Soviet Union, Stalin ordered the deportation of Russian Germans to labor camps in Siberia and Central Asia, as he was suspicious of potential collaboration with the invaders. In some areas, his forces attempted to bulldoze the German churches and reused their tombstones for paving blocks. Many Germans in the Americas sent donations back to their communities, but others permanently lost contact with their relatives during the social disruptions of the Ukrainian famine, Stalin's Great Purge, and World War II.

Areas of immigration 
Unlike many other immigrants to the Americas during the late 19th and early 20th centuries, Germans from Russia wanted to continue farming and settled in agricultural areas, rather than industrial cities. Primary areas were the Plains states of Illinois, Nebraska, Kansas, North and South Dakota with some movement to specific areas of Washington State and California (such as Fresno and Lodi) in the United States; Saskatchewan and Manitoba in Canada; Brazil; and Argentina. Those areas tended to resemble the flat plains of the Russian steppes. In addition, the upper Great Plains still had arable land available for free settlement under the Homestead Act. In the 2000 Census, North Dakota reported 43.9% of the population identified as having German ancestry. In 1910, 5% of the population of North Dakota had been born in Russia; it is likely that most were ethnic Germans.

Large-scale immigration to the Americas started in the 1870s and continued until the 1917 Revolution, when travel and emigration were stopped.

Since the reunification of Germany after the fall of the Berlin Wall and the declining conditions in Russia, many ethnic Germans still living in the lands of the former Soviet Union sought German repatriation.

United States

Germans from Russia were the most traditional German-speakers. About 100,000 Volga Germans immigrated by 1900 and settled primarily in the Dakotas, Kansas, and Nebraska. The south-central part of North Dakota was known as the "German-Russian triangle." A smaller number moved farther west and found employment as ranchers and cowboys.

The largest groups settled mainly in the Great Plains: North Dakota, South Dakota, Kansas and nearby areas. Outside those areas, they also settled in Iowa, Michigan, Minnesota, New York State, Oregon, Washington State, Wisconsin, and California's Fresno County in the Central Valley. They often succeeded in dryland farming, which they had practiced in Russia. Many immigrants who arrived between 1870 and 1912 spent a period doing farm labor, especially in northeastern Colorado and in Montana along the lower Yellowstone River in sugar beet fields. Their family and community lifestyle and their contribution to the sugar beet industry on the plains of Colorado is well-documented in "Work Renders Life Sweet: Germans from Russia in Fort Collins, 1900 - 2000." They were often sugar beet farmers almost everywhere they settled.

Cities
Other Volga Germans made new lives in the industrializing American cities, especially in Chicago, which had an immense upsurge in immigration from Eastern Europe during that time. Chicago now has the largest number of ethnic Volga Germans in North America. The largest area of concentrated settlement was in Jefferson Park, on the city's Northwest Side, mostly between 1907 and 1920. By 1930, 450 families of the Evangelical faith were living in that area, most of whom originated from Wiesenseite. Later, during the period of suburbanization, many of their descendants moved out to outlying areas such as Maywood and Melrose Park. Many families living in the Jefferson Park central business district along Lawrence and Milwaukee Avenue have Volga German immigrant ancestors.

Wheat
Bernhard Warkentin, born in a small Russian village in 1847, travelled to America in his early twenties. Interested in flour mills, he was especially impressed with the wheat-growing possibilities in the United States. After he had visited Kansas, Warkentin found the Great Plains much like those that he had left behind. Settling in Harvey County, Kansas, he built a water mill on the banks of the Little Arkansas River, the Halstead Milling and Elevator Company. Warkentin's greatest contribution to Kansas was the introduction of hard Turkey Wheat into Kansas, which replaced the soft variety grown exclusively in the state.

Culture
Negatively influenced by the violation of their rights and cultural persecution by the tsar, the Russian Germans who settled in the northern Midwest saw themselves a downtrodden ethnic group that was separate from Russian Americans and had an entirely different experience from the German Americans who had immigrated from German lands. The Volga German settled in tight-knit communities, which retained their German language and culture. They raised large families, built German-style churches, buried their dead in distinctive cemeteries by using wrought iron grave markers, and created choir groups that sang German church hymns. Many farmers specialized in sugar beets, still a major crop in the upper Great Plains. During World War I, their identity was challenged by anti-German sentiment. 

By the end of the World War II, the German language, which had always been used with English for public and official matters, had seriously declined. German is now preserved mainly through singing groups and recipes, with the Germans from Russia in the northern Great Plains states speaking predominantly English. Thw latter kind of Kuchen has been the state dessert of South Dakota since 2013. Despite the loss of their language, the Volga Germans have remained distinct and left a lasting impression on the American West.

Memory
During the 1970s, Dr. Kenneth Rock, a professor of history at Colorado State University, collected 60 oral histories of Russian German immigrants and their descendants as part of the "Germans from Russia in Colorado" Study Project. He documented life in the ethnic German communities in Russia, the immigration experience, work and social life in the United States, and interaction between the Russian-German communities and the wider society in both Russia and the United States. They were often described as looking like Russians but sounding like Germans.

Approximately one million descendants of Germans from Russia live in the United States. Modern descendants in Canada and the United States refer to their heritage as Germans from Russia, Russian Germans,  or Black Sea Germans. In many parts of the United States, they tend to have blended to a large degree with the "regular" German Americans, who are much more numerous than Russian Germans in the northern half of the United States.

Canada

Background
In addition to the large population of Volga Germans that settled on the American prairie, many also settled in the Canadian West. In the early 1870s, the Canadian government had begun to create promotional programs in Europe to entice settlers to the largely-unsettled western areas in what would become Alberta, Saskatchewan, Manitoba, and British Columbia. Public policy also served to attract immigration following the passage of the federal Dominion Lands Act of 1872, which provided free grants of homesteads to those who settled on the Canadian prairie. In the early 20th century, many immigrants moved from the United States to Canada in search of inexpensive land and greater social autonomy. Those German-American immigrants brought not only their experience working on the American plains but also their accrued wealth, which gave a much-needed boost to the economy of Western Canada.

1875–1918
The Volga Germans who flocked to Canada in the late 19th and the early 20th centuries came from different religious backgrounds, including Lutheran, Catholic, and Mennonite. The last group, named after the founder Menno Simons, was the largest portion of the immigrant population. Those Mennonites were Plautdietsch-speaking people of Dutch decent who in Russia had been the best organized by preparing scouting parties to investigate the prospect of immigration to Canada and the United States. The scouts had been reliant on the assistance of established Mennonite groups such as those found in Lancaster County, Pennsylvania, and in Ontario. From 1873 to 1879, Mennonites formed block settlements in Manitoba such as the East Reserve and West Reserve, with a total of close to 7,000 members. Most settled in southern Manitoba in the richest part of the Red River Valley. The communities were centered around religious homogeneity, the insistence on the tenets of adult baptism, and the refusal to bear arms or to swear an oath. Many Mennonites had been propelled to leave because of the introduction of extended conscription, which had been put into place in 1874 and was set to take effect in Russia in 1881.

Many Volga Germans emigrated from the United States to Western Canada from 1890 to1909. They sought to escape rising land prices and the imposition of laws that had begun to encroach on their relative autonomy. Canada was seen as a new frontier and a place of vast land but little settlement. The immigrants settled mainly in the colonies of St. Peter and St. Joseph, East and West of Saskatoon, in central Saskatchewan. In the 1890s, twelve Catholic families established Rastadt-Dorf, and another twenty-one settled Katherinetal. Additional settlements were begun in Davin, Kronau, and Speyer.

Interwar period
During the interwar period, conditions in Russia worsened, especially after the Revolution and the Great Famine of 1921. Many Volga Germans sought to leave the Soviet Union but faced opposition from a government that did not wish to see such a large portion of its population leave. The government imposed a fee for obtaining a passport, which led to protests as many would-be immigrants flooded the streets of Moscow. Many Mennonites were eventually able to leave, and between the World Wars, over 20,000 of them left destined for Canada.

From the 1910s to several years after the end of the Second World War, the ethnic background of the Volga Germans made them prey to discrimination in Canada. By 1914, Germany had become Canada's enemy, and the Volga Germans were not immune although many families has not set foot in Germany for hundreds of years. This period saw the suppression of many German cultural customs, including the suppression of their print media and the closure of German schools. The federal Wartime Elections Act, passed in September 1917, revoked the citizenship of any German naturalized after March 1902. Many settlements were renamed to disguise their obvious German origin.

The 1920s also saw the movement of Volga Germans within Western Canada as well. Many pushed further west and settled in British Columbia. The area had the appeal of a warmer climate, an escape from the frigid prairie. Other Volga Germans were propelled by economic factors such as the Great Depression, which not only impoverished many but also coincided with a tremendous drought ushering in crop failures. The economy of the Prairies and much of the rest of Canada was dependent on the success of wheat farming. Wheat had been a staple crop for the Volga Germans in Russia and adapted well to the climate of Western Canada. Repeated crop failures meant a large influx of German-Russiana to larger cities and towns, which would contribute to the gradual decline of their culturally-homogeneous communities. The prairie lands abutting the United States border experienced Dust Bowl conditions, which sent swarms of families to the coastal areas of British Columbia. Throughout the period after World War II, new immigrants joined their families in British Columbia and congregated in the Fraser Valley and Vancouver Island.

The mid-20th century brought immigrants from South America, mainly Argentina and Brazil, who fought to maintain their cultural autonomy in increasingly-nationalist countries dominated by leaders like Juan Perón.

Lutheran and Catholic Volga Germans were also significant migrants to Canada but lacked the organization of their Mennonite brethren. Early on, they were more likely to settle in Saskatchewan, especially around Regina. Despite their location near earlier Mennonite communities, Catholic and Lutheran settlements remained religiously homogenous.

Legacy
Throughout their history in Western Canada, the Volga Germans have maintained many of their cultural characteristics, including their dialects, which have been proliferated through Saturday schools and Canadian policies that allowed for cultural freedom. Those schools operated on Saturday mornings for around three hours and became especially vital as German stopped being taught in Canadian public schools after World War I. The Mennonites, unlike most Volga Germans, maintained those schools even after World War II. The Volga Germans' dialects was also maintained by the churches, especially for Mennonite.

Before the Volga Germans left for North America, they had been regarded as privileged colonists in Russia. When they arrived in the United States and Canada, they found that they were treated the same as any other migrant group from Eastern Europe. The Mennonites may be seen as an exception since they successfully used connections with their brethren in Lancaster County, Pennsylvania, and in Ontario. Through their hard work on the North American plains, they established themselves as a productive portion of society in both Canada and America.

Language 
The Germans from Russia originally spoke German dialects such as the Palatine dialect or Mennonite Low German at home. Since the villages in Russia often were populated by settlers from a particular region and isolated from Germany, they maintained their regional dialects. Depending on their specific dialect, Germans from Russia had difficulties understanding Standard German, which can differ greatly from the dialects. After emigrating from Russia to the Americas, the Germans kept speaking their dialects.

In the 1950s it was still common for children in the Dakotas to speak in English and for the parents and grandparents to use German. Songs in church would be sung in both languages simultaneously. Probably the person best known for having a "German from Russia accent" in English, a result of his having learned English as a second language, was the bandleader and television star Lawrence Welk.

Notable descendants of Germans from Russia 
 Philip Anschutz, businessman
 Craig Bohl, football coach
 Tom Daschle, former U.S. Senate Majority Leader
 John Denver (Henry John Deutschendorf, Jr.), singer
 Paul Revere Dick, Paul Revere and the Raiders
 Angie Dickinson, actress
 Joe Exotic, felonious zookeeper
 Phyllis Frelich, Tony winning actress
 Johnny Hopp, baseball player
 Chris Isaak, singer-songwriter
 Bernd Leno, football player
 Randy Meisner, musician and former band member of the Eagles
 Roman Neustädter, football player
 Brian Schweitzer, former Governor of Montana
 Brian Urlacher, former American football player
 Lawrence Welk, band leader
 Carson Wentz, football player

See also
Black Sea Germans
Bessarabia Germans
Der Staats Anzeiger, their North Dakota newspaper
History of Germans in Russia and the Soviet Union
History of Saskatchewan
Russian Mennonites
Hutterites

Notes

Further reading
 
 Gross, Fred William. "Type and Nature of German Publications In North Dakota," Heritage Review (1993) 23#4 pp 34–38. 
 Iseminger, Gordon L. "Are We Germans, or Russians, or Americans? The McIntosh County German-Russians During World War I", North Dakota History (1992) 59#2 pp: 2–16.
  Koch, Fred C. The Volga Germans: In Russia and the Americas, from 1763 to the Present (1977). 
 Kloberdanz, Timothy J. “The Volga Germans in Old Russia and in Western North America: Their Changing World View.” Anthropological Quarterly 48, no. 4 (October 1, 1975): 209–222. doi:10.2307/3316632.
 
 Rempfer, Michael, and James Gessele, "Der Staats-Anzeiger:' Salute to its Centennial Founding." Heritage Review (2006) 36#3 pp 37–42
 Sackett, S. J. "History of the Volga Germans in Ellis and Rush Counties, Kansas." (1976). online

External links 
 American Historical Society of Germans from Russia
 Germans From Russia Heritage Society
 German-Russian Settlement Map
 Germans from Russia Settlement Locations on Google Map
 Germans from Volhynia – genealogy, culture, history
 JewishGen Gazetteer
 Manifesto of the Empress Catherine II issued July 22, 1763
 Vistula Germans – history and map settlements by religion

 
 
 
German

de:Russlanddeutsche